The 1945 Soviet Cup was an association football cup competition of the Soviet Union.

Competition schedule

First round
 [Sep 9] 
 DINAMO Alma-Ata              3-0  Traktor Chelyabinsk 
 DINAMO Baku                  2-0  Zenit Sverdlovsk 
 [Sep 16] 
 DINAMO Yerevan               4-2  DKA Novosibirsk             [aet] 
 DKA Tbilisi                  3-3  Krylya Sovetov Molotov 
 [Sep 20] 
 Dinamo Kiev                  0-2  LOKOMOTIV Kharkov 
   [Anatoliy Gorokhov 35, Boris Gurkin 89 pen] 
 [Sep 23] 
 DINAMO Ivanovo               3-2  BaltFlot Leningrad          [aet] 
   [Alexei Yeryomin 90, 97, 112 - ?] 
 Dinamo Minsk                 3-4  STAKHANOVETS Stalino 
   [Viktor Polunin-2, Boris Chitaia pen – Oleg Zhukov-2, Ivan Mitronov, Vasiliy Bryushin] 
 Torpedo Gorkiy               0-3  TORPEDO Moskva 
   [Vasiliy Panfilov pen, ?, ?] 
 ZENIT Leningrad              1-0  MVO Moskva                  [aet] 
   [Boris Chuchelov 107] 
 [Sep 25] 
 Spartak Leningrad            1-6  DINAMO Moskva 
   [Georgiy Lasin 52 pen – Konstantin Beskov 18, Vasiliy Trofimov 25, Sergei Solovyov 37, 68, Anatoliy Mishuk (S) 42 og, Nikolai Dementyev 79] 
 [Sep 27] 
 DINAMO Tbilisi               2-0  Pishchevik Odessa          [in Moskva] 
   [Boris Frolov 10, Boris Paichadze 85] 
 [Sep 28] 
 CDKA Moskva                  3-0  VVS Moskva 
   [Ivan Shcherbakov, Vsevolod Bobrov, Vladimir Dyomin] 
 DINAMO Leningrad             5-1  Lokomotiv Moskva 
   [Anatoliy Viktorov-3, Oreshkin, Alexandr I.Fyodorov - ?] 
 KRYLYA SOVETOV Moskva        3-1  Krylya Sovetov Kuibyshev 
   [Alexandr Sevidov-2, Igor Gorshkov – Sergei Rumyantsev] 
 SPARTAK Moskva               3-1  Trudoviye Rezervy Moskva 
   [Viktor Semyonov-2 Oleg Timakov - ?] 
 ZiS Moskva     1-2  TRAKTOR Stalingrad 
   [? – Pyotr Kalmykov 1, 3]

First round replays
 [Sep 17] 
 DKA Tbilisi                  5-0  Krylya Sovetov Molotov

Second round
 [Sep 16] 
 DINAMO Alma-Ata              2-1  Dinamo Baku         [in Krasnodar] 
 [Sep 23] 
 DKA Tbilisi                  3-0  Dinamo Yerevan 
 [Sep 26] 
 ZENIT Leningrad              3-1  Lokomotiv Kharkov 
   [Sergei Salnikov-2 Boris Chuchelov - ?] 
 [Sep 29] 
 DINAMO Moskva                5-2  Torpedo Moskva 
   [Sergei Solovyov 12, Alexandr Malyavkin 28, Leonid Solovyov 38 pen, Konstantin Beskov 64, Nikolai Dementyev 82 – Kuzin 21, Vasiliy Panfilov 40 pen] 
 [Sep 30] 
 CDKA Moskva                  5-1  Krylya Sovetov Moskva 
   [Alexei Grinin-2 (1 pen), Vladimir Dyomin-2, Valentin Nikolayev - ?] 
 DINAMO Leningrad             3-2  Stakhanovets Stalino 
   [Vasiliy Lotkov 75 pen, ?, Yevgeniy Arkhangelskiy ? – Alexandr Andreyenko 4, Oleg Zhukov 19] 
 [Oct 1] 
 Spartak Moskva               1-2  DINAMO Tbilisi 
   [Nikolai Gulyayev 44 – Viktor Berezhnoi 20, Boris Paichadze 25] 
 [Oct 2] 
 TRAKTOR Stalingrad           2-0  Dinamo Ivanovo      [in Moskva] 
   [Yuriy Belousov 43, Alexandr Sapronov 88]

Quarterfinals
 [Oct 4] 
 ZENIT Leningrad              2-1  DKA Tbilisi 
   [Sergei Salnikov 43, Viktor Bodrov 88 pen - ?] 
 [Oct 5] 
 CDKA Moskva                  1-0  Dinamo Tbilisi 
   [Vsevolod Bobrov 57] 
 TRAKTOR Stalingrad           1-0  Dinamo Alma-Ata     [in Moskva] 
   [Sergei Papkov 82] 
 [Oct 6] 
 DINAMO Moskva                4-0  Dinamo Leningrad 
   [Nikolai Dementyev 7, Konstantin Beskov 18, Sergei Solovyov 42, 57]

Semifinals
 [Oct 9] 
 CDKA Moskva             7-0  Zenit Leningrad 
   [Vsevolod Bobrov 14, 57, ?, 85, Vladimir Dyomin 34, Valentin Nikolayev 49, ?] 
 [Oct 10] 
 DINAMO Moskva           3-1  Traktor Stalingrad 
   [Konstantin Beskov 35, 50, Sergei Solovyov 75 – Viktor Shvedchenko 33]

Final

External links
 Complete calendar. helmsoccer.narod.ru
 1945 Soviet Cup. Footballfacts.ru
 1945 Soviet football season. RSSSF

Soviet Cup seasons
Cup
Soviet Cup
Soviet Cup